The 1389 papal conclave (25 October – 2 November) was convoked after the death of Pope Urban VI. The conclave is historically unique because all of the cardinal electors were the creation of a single pontiff: Urban VI, the very pope who was being replaced. None of the surviving cardinals created by previous popes recognized Urban VI as legitimate (see: Western Schism). In addition, Urban VI had deposed four of his creatures, and three were absent, leaving only sixteen cardinal electors.

Cardinal electors

Absentee cardinals

References

14th-century elections
1389
14th-century Catholicism
1389